Muhammad Imran (born 12 January 1979) is a former Pakistani field hockey player who played as a full back and captained the Pakistan national team.

Career

2012
In December, he captained the gold medal winning team at the 2012 Asian Champions Trophy in Doha, Qatar.

2014
In September, he captained the silver medal winning team at the Asian Games in Incheon, South Korea.

2015
Pakistan's hockey team failed to qualify for Rio Olympic Games 2016 while Muhammad Imran was the captain of the team. Since 1948, it was the first time that Pakistan's hockey team haven't played in the mega-event.

References

Living people
1979 births
Pakistani male field hockey players
Asian Games gold medalists for Pakistan
Asian Games medalists in field hockey
Field hockey players at the 2006 Asian Games
Field hockey players at the 2010 Asian Games
Field hockey players at the 2014 Asian Games
Field hockey players at the 2008 Summer Olympics
Field hockey players at the 2012 Summer Olympics
2006 Men's Hockey World Cup players
2010 Men's Hockey World Cup players
Olympic field hockey players of Pakistan
Asian Games silver medalists for Pakistan
Commonwealth Games medallists in field hockey
Commonwealth Games silver medallists for Pakistan
Medalists at the 2010 Asian Games
Medalists at the 2014 Asian Games
Field hockey players at the 2006 Commonwealth Games
Medallists at the 2006 Commonwealth Games